The Briscoe was an American automobile manufactured at Jackson, Michigan, by a group headed by Benjamin Briscoe.  Briscoe cars were made between 1914 and 1921.

A few months after his departure from the United States Motor Company in 1913, Benjamin Briscoe established a plant at Billancourt, France to design and manufacture the first automobile in France built by American methods. The business was called Briscoe Freres; Billancourt was the home of Renault.

In 1915, Briscoe offered what he called "The First French Car at an American Price."  Briscoe claimed that the auto had been designed by a French design studio.  It featured a single headlamp in the front, faired into the radiator shell.  The auto was priced at US$750.00 but this price did not include a top, windshield, or starter.

The company also produced the Argo, the Hackett, and the Lorraine.

References

Purdy, Ken W., Motorcars of the Golden Past, Galahad Books, 1965, pp. 82–83.

Defunct manufacturing companies based in Michigan
Defunct motor vehicle manufacturers of the United States
Motor vehicle manufacturers based in Michigan
American companies established in 1914
American companies disestablished in 1921
Manufacturing companies established in 1914
Manufacturing companies disestablished in 1921